Campo San Barnaba is a campo (square) in the Dorsoduro sestiere of Venice, Italy. The neighborhood's church is the San Barnaba.

The square has been featured in numerous films, including David Lean's Summertime, where Katharine Hepburn falls into a canal as she steps backwards while photographing, and Indiana Jones and the Last Crusade where the church's façade served as the exterior to a library.

See also

References

Dorsoduro
San Barnaba